Rachel Lawson (born June 11, 1972) is an American former collegiate softball first basemen and current head coach at Kentucky. Lawson played college softball for the UMass Minutewomen in the Atlantic 10 Conference from 1991 to 1994, helping them to the 1992 Women's College World Series.

Coaching career
In July 2007, Lawson was named the head coach at Kentucky. Lawson led Kentucky to their first ever Women's College World Series appearance in 2014. She is the winningest coach in program history.

Statistics

UMass Minutewomen

Head coaching record

References

External links
 

Living people
Female sports coaches
American softball coaches
American softball players
Kentucky Wildcats softball coaches
UMass Minutewomen softball players
Maryland Terrapins softball coaches
Western Kentucky Lady Toppers softball coaches
1972 births